Tinne is a Germanic female given name.

Notable people with this name include:
 Tinne Gilis, Belgian squash player
 Tinne Hoff Kjeldsen, Danish mathematician
 Tinne Kruse, Danish badminton player
 Tinne Van der Straeten, Flemish politician
 Tinne Vilhelmson-Silfvén, Swedish horse rider